Belfast High School (BHS) is a co-educational voluntary grammar school in Jordanstown, Newtownabbey, County Antrim, Northern Ireland. It was established in 1854 and is within the North Eastern Region of the Education Authority.

In May 2007, it was awarded Specialist Status in Languages and in March 2012, it has been recognised as one of only six post-primary schools in Northern Ireland to be in the top 10% for performance at both GCSE and A-level.

History 
The institution now known as Belfast High School opened in 1854. In 1874, it moved to new premises at Glenravel Street, Belfast.
Since the school was founded, there have been 7 head teachers:
(1854–1867) John Pyper, who established the school as Pyper Academy, before changing its name to the Belfast Mercantile Academy shortly thereafter.
(1867–1917) James Pyper, the school's longest-serving headmaster.  He was responsible for the building of what the Ulster Star described as "Mr Pyper's splendid new seminary" in Glenravel Street.
(1917–1937) Spring Pyper
(1938–1966) Dr Robert Harte, who changed the school's name to its current title. Under his headship the school purchased Ardilea House, a large 19th-century villa in Jordanstown, in 1953.  Between then and 1963, when the entire school re-located from Glenravel Street, its then Vice-Principal, Harry Towell, headed a small suburban campus at the site. The house now forms the administration block, containing the staff room, sick bay, and offices of the principal, her secretary, the bursar and vice-principal. Dr Harte suffered a severe stroke in 1964 and his son acted as temporary head until the appointment of Mr Dunlop in 1966. Dr Harte was a Doctor of Philosophy and an eminent classical scholar.
(1966–1987) Samuel H Dunlop, who saw the building of a new science block (1970), the closure of Somerton House (the school's preparatory department) in 1981 and the enlargement of the school library (1980s)
(1987–2006) Stephen R Hilditch, who saw the Harte Building opened in the 1990s to house Home Economics, Careers, Technology, ICT and a science lab, the refurbishment of the science block (2001–2003) and the refurbishment and enlargement of the Music Department
(2006–2018) Lynn F Gormley, who saw the installation of a state-of-the-art sports and fitness building which was opened by Dame Mary Peters in 2016.
(2018–present) Charlotte Weir, who had previously served as Acting Head Teacher and Deputy Head Teacher.

Houses 
The school has a house system. The tie a pupil wears is blue with a thick yellow band pattern, and a thinner band pattern of an additional colour representing the pupil's house.

The houses and their colours are as follows:
 Boyd (green)
 Pyper (blue)
 Storey (red)
 Watson (yellow)

Sports 
The four main sports at Belfast High are cricket, hockey, netball and rugby.

Notable alumni 

 Steve Aiken, Member of the Northern Irish Assembly
 George Cassidy, former Bishop of Southwell and Nottingham
 Tommy Cassidy, Northern Ireland international footballer, who played for Newcastle United and Burnley
 Edward Samuel Wesley de Cobain, MP, disgraced Conservative politician
 Fred Henderson, Socialist writer
 George MacDowell Kane, Artist and sculptor
 Alex Crawford, international footballer: Distillery and Cliftonville right-half and Captain of Ireland in 1880s and 1890s
 Jonny Evans, Leicester City and Northern Ireland international football player
 Sir Ronnie Flanagan, retired Chief Inspector of Constabulary, Northern Ireland
 Alan McNeill, professional football player
 Stephen Rea, film actor
 Mark McCrea, Ulster rugby player
 Maurice Field, former Ulster and Ireland rugby player
 Paul Stirling, Ireland cricketer
 Sinéad Morrissey, poet
 Harold Miller Church of Ireland Bishop of Down.

See also 
 List of grammar schools in Northern Ireland

References

External links 
 

Newtownabbey
Grammar schools in County Antrim
Educational institutions established in 1854
1854 establishments in Ireland
Specialist colleges in Northern Ireland